Higgs may refer to:

Physics
Higgs boson, an elementary particle
Higgs mechanism, an explanation for electroweak symmetry breaking
Higgs field, a quantum field

People
Alan Higgs (died 1979), English businessman and philanthropist
Blaine Higgs (born 1954), Canadian politician; Premier of New Brunswick
Denis Higgs (1929–2011), English mathematician
Derek Higgs (1944–2008), an English business leader and merchant banker
Dustin Higgs (1972–2021), American convicted murderer
Eric Sidney Higgs (1908–1976), English archaeologist
George Higgs (1930–2013), American Piedmont blues musician
Griffin Higgs (1589–1659), an English churchman
Henry Higgs (1864–1940), English civil servant, economist and historian of economic thought
Henry Marcellus Higgs (also known as H.M. Higgs) (1855–1929), an English composer and music arranger
Joe Higgs (1940–1999), Jamaican singer and musician
John Higgs, English writer, novelist, journalist
Ken Higgs (1937–2016), English cricketer
Kenneth Higgs (1886–1959), English cricketer
Kenny Higgs (born 1955), American retired basketball player, brother of Mark Higgs
Mark Higgs (born 1966), American football player who played in the National Football League, brother of Kenny Higgs
Michael Higgs (politician) (1912–1995), British Member of Parliament
Peter Higgs (born 1929), physicist and Nobel Prize laureate, namesake of the Higgs boson particle
Ray Higgs, Australian rugby league footballer
Rebekah Higgs (born 1982), Canadian singer
Robert Higgs (born 1944), American economist
Robert W. Higgs, South African admiral
Shane Higgs (born 1977), English footballer

Fiction
Higgs, narrator in the 1872 novel Erewhon by Samuel Butler
John Higgs, a silent character in The Archers on BBC Radio 4
Higgs Monaghan, an antagonist in Hideo Kojima's 2019 video game Death Stranding

English-language surnames